Kollektsioner (Collector) or formerly Sovetskii Kollektsioner (Soviet Collector) is a Russian central philatelic yearbook. This annual publication started in 1963 and covered the history and design of postage stamps, and other related topics.

History 
For a number of earlier years, there was a magazine Sovetskii Kollektsioner (Soviet Collector). It was issued jointly with or instead of another magazine, Sovetskii Filatelist (Soviet Philatelist), published from 1922 to 1932 by the All-Russian Society of Philatelists.

The yearbook under the name of Sovetskii Kollektsioner first appeared in Moscow in 1963.

Sovetskii Kollektsioner contained research articles in philately and other forms of collecting. For example, in the yearbook No. 3, 1965, Yu. Parmenov wrote an article entitled The First Soviet Postage Stamps. This was the first publication about discovery of the very  issued in 1918. They were based on a design by Rihards Zariņš that depicted a hand with a sword cutting a chain.

See also 
 Filateliya
 List of philatelic magazines
 Postage stamps and postal history of Russia
 Soviet Philatelist

References 

Philately of the Soviet Union
Philately of Russia
1963 establishments in the Soviet Union
Philatelic periodicals
Annual magazines
Russian-language magazines
Magazines established in 1963
Magazines published in Moscow
Magazines published in the Soviet Union